Psychobiotics is a term used in preliminary research to refer to live bacteria that, when ingested in appropriate amounts, might confer a mental health benefit by affecting microbiota of the host organism. Whether bacteria might play a role in the gut-brain axis is under research. A 2020 literature review suggests that the consumption of psychobiotics could be considered as a viable option to restore mental health  although lacking randomized controlled trials on clear mental health outcomes in humans.

Types 

In experimental probiotic psychobiotics, the bacteria most commonly used are gram-positive bacteria, such as Bifidobacterium and Lactobacillus families, as these do not contain lipopolysaccharide chains, reducing the likelihood of an immunological response. Prebiotics are substances, such as fructans and oligosaccharides, that induce the growth or activity of beneficial microorganisms, such as bacteria on being fermented in the gut. Multiple bacterial species contained in a single probiotic broth is known as a polybiotic.

Research 
A 2021 review showed that treating anxiety in young people with psychobiotics had no significant effect. There is a need for more diverse human studies, mainly because those that exist have contradictory outcomes.

Species

Several species of bacteria have been used in probiotic psychobiotic research:

 Lactobacillus helveticus
 Bifidobacterium longum
 Lactobacillus casei
 Lactobacillus plantarum
 Lactobacillus acidophilus
 Lactobacillus delbrueckii subsp. bulgaricus
 Bifidobacterium breve
 Bifidobacterium infantis
 Streptococcus salivarius
Lactobacillus rhamnosus
Lactobacillus gasseri

References 

Bacteriology
Digestive system
 
Gut flora